Jan Rommel Osuna Roberto (born December 2, 1993), professionally known as Jak Roberto, is a Filipino actor, model and singer. He was a member of the trio boy band 3LOGY alongside Jeric Gonzales and Abel Estanislao. Roberto is currently working as an exclusive artist of GMA Network, and is known for his role as Andres "Andoy" dela Cruz in the 2017 television series Meant to Be. He is the brother to his fellow GMA artist, Sanya Lopez.

Early life
Jak Roberto was born as Jan Rommel Osuna Roberto on December 2, 1993, in Nagcarlan, Laguna, Philippines of parents Ramil Roberto and Marlyn Osuna. He has a younger sister named Shaira Lenn Osuna Roberto, popularly known under the stage name Sanya Lopez. Roberto currently resides in Tandang Sora, Quezon City with sister Sanya.

Career

2011–present: Beginnings
Roberto started his career as a regular co-host of Walang Tulugan with the Master Showman. Roberto later appeared on small roles on various programs of GMA Network. In 2014, Roberto portrayed Ambo in the afternoon series The Half Sisters. In 2015, Roberto joined the trio boyband 3logy with Jeric Gonzales and Abel Estanislao, the group released a self-titled album under GMA Records. In 2017, Roberto portrayed Andres "Andoy" dela Cruz in Meant to Be.

Filmography

Television

Discography
 May Be It's You (3LOGY)

References

External links

 

1993 births
Living people
21st-century Filipino male actors
Filipino male television actors
Filipino male comedians
21st-century Filipino male singers
Filipino male models
Male actors from Laguna (province)
Tagalog people
GMA Network personalities